Andrii Oleksiyovych Sienichkin (born May 1, 1991) is a Ukrainian male artistic gymnast and a member of the national team. He participated at the 2015 World Artistic Gymnastics Championships in Glasgow, and qualified for the 2016 Summer Olympics.

References

External links 
 
 
 
                                    

1991 births
Living people
Ukrainian male artistic gymnasts
Place of birth missing (living people)
Gymnasts at the 2016 Summer Olympics
Olympic gymnasts of Ukraine
21st-century Ukrainian people